ŽFK Budućnost is a women's football club from Podgorica, Montenegro, founded in 2005. Until 2016, the team was known as ŽFK Palma. It plays in the Montenegrin Women's League. It is the oldest women's football club in Montenegro. Under the name ŽFK Palma, they won two champion titles in Montenegrin Women's League. ŽFK Budućnost is a part of Budućnost Podgorica sports society.

History
Founded at 2005 as ŽFK Palma, team won first two editions of Montenegrin Women's League (then FSCG trophy), on seasons 2008-09 and 2009–10. Palma played in First League until the end of season 2012–13.
At start of 2016, team was renamed. Under the new name, ŽFK Budućnost Podgorica became a part of most successful Montenegrin sports society - SD Budućnost Podgorica. After the few seasons, ŽFK Budućnost gained promotion to Montenegrin Women's League 2016–17.

Honours and achievements
National Championship:
winners (2): 2008–09, 2009–10
runners-up (2): 2011–12, 2019–20

See also
Montenegrin Women's League
Football in Montenegro

References

External links
Football Association of Montenegro

Women's football clubs in Montenegro
Association football clubs established in 2005